Primitive Culture is an 1871 book by Edward Burnett Tylor. In his book, Tylor debates the relationship between "primitive" societies, and "civilized" societies, a key theme in 19th century anthropological literature.

Evolutionism 
Tylor's work can be connected to theories present in 19th century literature including Lewis Henry Morgan's "ethnical periods". Among 19th century anthropologists, many saw what now may be called "tribal" states and societies, as lacking in form, progress, and development. Both Tylor and Morgan aligned somewhat with this viewpoint, Morgan believing in stages in order from savagery, barbarism, to civilization, and Tylor concluding that savagery is the lower stage of civilization. Tylor; unlike Morgan however; believed in "Prichardian Ethnological Monogenism", something he learnt in turn during his travels in Mexico from Henry Christy (1810-1865). Today, most anthropologists generally believe these views to be unsubstantiated.

See also
 American anthropology
 Civilization
 Ethnology
 Noble savage
 Primitivism
 Uncontacted peoples

References 

 https://www.marxists.org/reference/archive/morgan-lewis/ancient-society/ch01.htm
https://www.britannica.com/topic/Primitive-Culture-by-Tylor

Further reading
Stanley Diamond, In Search of the Primitive, Transaction Publishers, U.S. 1987, 
Adam Kuper, The Reinvention of Primitive Society. Transformations of a Myth, Taylor & Francis Ltd. 2005, 
Joseph Campbell, The Masks of God: Primitive Mythology, Viking, 1959; reissued by Penguin, 1991 
Joseph Campbell, The Historical Atlas of World Mythology, vols. I and II, Harper and Row 1988, 1989.
Morgan, Lewis, H. (1877) Ancient Society, "Ethnical Periods".

Ancient culture
Anthropological categories of peoples
Culture